Faridpur Polytechnic Institute, often abbreviated as FPI, is a government technical institute in Faridpur, Dhaka, Bangladesh. It is one of the oldest polytechnic institutes in Bangladesh.

History 
The institute was established in 1963 as Faridpur Technical Institute. In 1967, it was reformed as Faridpur Polytechnic Institute.

Location 
Faridpur Polytechnic Institute is located at Baitul Aman, a neighborhood of Faridpur city in Bangladesh. It is near Baitul Aman campus of the Government Rajendra College, Faridpur.

Academic programs and departments 

It offers diploma-level programmes for Diploma-in-Engineering in many different technological areas, each required to study for a 4-year-long curriculum.

Students can participate in:
 Civil engineering
 Computer engineering
 Refrigeration and air conditioning engineering
 Electrical engineering
 Mechanical engineering
 Power engineering

There is a department for each of the above programmes and a related subject department called as Non-tech. Each department is headed by a chief instructor (CI). So, there are total of seven departments in Faridpur Polytechnic Institute.

Students 
As of January 2022, there are 3824 students in 6 departments in the institute.

Academic staff
The principal is Engr. Md. Akkas Ali Sheikh. 

Departments heads include:
Civil Technology:  
Md. Ismail Hossain (1st Shift)
Md. Nurul Islam Bhuiyan (2nd Shift)
Electrical Technology: 
Moniruzzaman Raju (1st Shift)
Md.Shah Sikander (2nd Shift)
Mechanical Technology:
Prokash Kumar Saha
SM Ishaque
Power Technology: 
SM Ishaque
Computer Technology: 
Md. Ripan Mian (2nd Shift)
Fahim Ahmed (1st Shift)
Refrigeration and Air Conditioning Technology: Mohammad Reaz Hossain
Non-Tech:
Md. Jahangir Alam 
Md. Mujibor Rahman Bhuiyan 

Currently there are about 62 teachers in the institute.

Facilities  

The institute has necessary facilities to keep up good educational environment. Government and institute authority are always doing their best to improve the existing facilities and adding more to it.

Halls of residence 
There three dormitories for students. Two are for boys and one for girls.
Kobi Alaul Hall 
Shahid Titumir Hall 
Women Hall

Workshops and laboratories 

Refrigeration and air condition lab
R.A.C. Lab
Electrical Wiring Shop
Electrical Machine Shop
ENT LAB
Audio Visual LAB
Machine Shop
Welding Shop
Sheet Metal Lab
Materials Testing Lab
Steam lab
Wood Shop
Mason Shop
Software lab
Digital lab
Physics lab
Chemistry lab
Auto diesel shop
Fuels and lubricants lab
Hydraulics lab
Foundry shop
Steam and gas lab

Library 
There is a library in the institute for the use of students, teachers and staff. The library is kept open during institute hours to enable the students to study. Students can borrow necessary books for a semester without any fees.

Mosque 
There is an air conditioning mosque in the institute.

Flower garden 
There are several local and foreign flower gardens here. Which made this institute look awesome.

Political views 
That institute is a non-political institute.

Directorates 
The institute operates under the executive control of the Ministry of Education(MOE) acting through the Directorate of Technical Education (DTE). The academic programmes, curriculams are maintained under the regulation of the Bangladesh Technical Education Board (BTEB). BTEB function under Directorate of Inspection and Audit (DIA), which in turn function under Chief Accounts Office (CAO), and it function under MOE.

See also
 Chandpur Polytechnic Institute
 Barisal Polytechnic Institute
 Dhaka Polytechnic Institute

References

External links 

 Official website of Faridpur Polytechnic Institute 
 Google Map direction of Faridpur Polytechnic Institute
  Directorate of Technical Education

Polytechnic institutes in Bangladesh
Colleges in Faridpur District
Universities and colleges in Dhaka
Educational institutions established in 1963
1963 establishments in East Pakistan